Northwestern Connecticut Community College (NCCC) is a public community college in Winsted, Connecticut.  As measured by enrollment it is the smallest or second-smallest of the twelve colleges in the Connecticut Community Colleges
system.

The school has an open admissions policy.  NCCC has about 1,600 full- and part-time students enrolled. A commuter school with no dormitories, the college's primary service area includes twenty towns in  Litchfield County.  Tunxis Community College in Farmington, Capital Community College in Hartford and Asnuntuck Community College in Enfield are the nearest of the state's other community colleges.

Along with credit and non credit certificates, the college grants the Associate in Arts and the Associate in Science degrees.

History 
The Northwestern Connecticut Community College was founded in 1965 by Winsted residents, including Ralph Nader's older brother, Shafeek Nader and Norfolk native Ralph H. Keiller.  It started as a private institution but the state took over funding and operation by November 1965.  It occupies the original Gilbert School building. NCCC was the fourth state funded community college in Connecticut. The Northwestern Community College Foundation was incorporated in 1981.

Academics
NCCC conducts the state’s only Veterinary Technology Program and it also runs an Interpreter Training Program for interpreters for the Deaf and the Deaf Studies Program.  There is also a Collegiate Education for Deaf and Hard of Hearing Persons (CEDHH) program. It is the sixth community college in the state to offer the Connecticut Community College Nursing Program (CT-CCNP).

Accreditation 
The college is accredited by the New England Commission of Higher Education and approved by the Connecticut Board of Governors for Higher Education. Additionally, specialized accreditation has been granted to programs in Veterinary Technology, Medical Assisting, and Early Childhood Education programs.

Campus 
The college is located on a rural town campus in Winsted, along  U.S. Route 44 and Connecticut Route 8.

The  Learning Resource Center was completed in 2003. The Library in the Learning Resource Center holds 41,000 volumes and subscribes to 180 periodicals, along with various audiovisual materials.

The 32,000 square-foot Arts and Science Center, completed in 2007, houses Chemistry, Microbiology, Biology, Physics and General Science laboratories on the first floor. The second floor consists of classrooms and lecture halls. On the third floor, there are art spaces for drawing, painting, ceramics, and graphic arts.

The newest building on campus, Joyner Health Sciences Center, opened in September 2017. The building consists of two floors and encompasses 24,400 gross square feet. The first floor is occupied by the Veterinary Technology Program, which has been ranked by TheBestColleges.org as the 40th best Veterinary Technician Program in the U.S. The first floor includes a surgical suite, X-Ray area, an animal dental area, a mock reception area, faculty offices, two general classrooms and a hematology laboratory. The second floor is home to the Allied Health program and comprises three Allied Health classrooms, a computer lab and faculty offices.

Student life 
The Alpha Nu Epsilon chapter of the Phi Theta Kappa (the academic honor society for two-year colleges) was
established at NCCC in 1987. The college also has a student newspaper, The Jabberwocky.

There is also an active student government body, the NCCC Student Senate.  Aside from the various clubs, the school has an academic skills center which helps both GED and Associate students in various topics from Nursing to Mathematics.

References

External links 
Official website

Community colleges in Connecticut
Educational institutions established in 1965
Winchester, Connecticut
Universities and colleges in Litchfield County, Connecticut
1965 establishments in Connecticut